Romdhan Chatta (25 November 1939 – 9 August 2017), was a Tunisian actor.

Originally from the Sahel region, the actor was known notably by his role of Hmidetou in the television series Mhal Chahed in the 1970s, alongside the actress Dalenda Abdou.

During his four decades of career, he played several successful roles such as that of the teacher in the play Maréchal Amma , a Tunisian adaptation of Le Bourgeois gentilhomme of Molière, or as Tijani Kalcita in El Khottab Al Bab, soap opera of the 1990s.

He died on 9 August 2017.

Actor

References

1939 births
2017 deaths
Tunisian male film actors
Tunisian male television actors
20th-century Tunisian male actors